Savcı or Savci is the Turkish word for prosecutor. It can refer to the following:

 Savcı Bey, Ottoman prince
 Saru Batu Savcı Bey, brother of Osman I
 Savcı Bey (fictional character), fictional character in Diriliş: Ertuğrul and Kuruluş: Osman, based on Saru Batu Savcı Bey
 Savcıbey, Söğüt, village in Turkey
 Savci, place in Slovenia
 Šavci, village in Serbia